Balendin Enbeita (May 20, 1906 – November 20, 1986) was a Basque Bertsolaritza (improvised sung poetry verse singer) and writer. His father was Kepa Enbeita Urretxindorra, his grandfather Juan Antonio Enbeita alias Txotxojeuri.

In the Spanish Civil War, where he fought for the Basque Government, he was wounded and later sentenced to twelve years imprisonment, of which he served four years.

In 1958 he founded in Ariatza the first Bertsolari school that produced many successful Bertsolaris, including his own son as well as Jon Lopategi, Jon Mugartegi, Deunoro Sardui, Ireneo Ajuria. He is considered the greatest promoter of Bertsolari in Bizkaia.

References 
 Brochure of the Culture Department of the Basque Government on the occasion of the 100th birthday of Enbeitas (Basque; PDF; 1.7 MB)

1906 births
1986 deaths
Basque writers
Place of birth missing
Spanish prisoners of war
People from Busturialdea
Basque-language poets
Spanish writers